Brentopara Inlet (‘Zaliv Brentopara’ \'za-liv bren-to-'pa-ra\) is the 7 km wide inlet indenting for 6.2 km the east coast of Churchill Peninsula, Oscar II Coast in Graham Land.  It is part of Adie Inlet entered southeast of Cavarus Point and northwest of Astro Cliffs.  The feature is named after the ancient Thracian town of Brentopara in Southern Bulgaria.

Location
British mapping in 1974.

Maps
 British Antarctic Territory: Graham Land.  Scale 1:250000 topographic map.  BAS 250 Series, Sheet SQ 19-20.  London, 1974.
 Antarctic Digital Database (ADD). Scale 1:250000 topographic map of Antarctica. Scientific Committee on Antarctic Research (SCAR). Since 1993, regularly upgraded and updated.

References
 Brentopara Inlet. SCAR Composite Antarctic Gazetteer.
 Bulgarian Antarctic Gazetteer. Antarctic Place-names Commission. (details in Bulgarian, basic data in English)

External links
 Brentopara Inlet. Copernix satellite image

Inlets of Graham Land
Oscar II Coast
Bulgaria and the Antarctic